Knut Hovel Heiaas (born 21 April 1977) is a retired Norwegian football striker who was known for his speed on the first 20 meters.

He hails from Dalefjerdingen. His first senior club was Strømmen, where he played from 1995 to 1999. Ahead of the 2000 season he joined Vålerenga IF, where he got five Norwegian Premier League games in 2000 and fourteen in 2002. After the 2002 season he joined Hønefoss BK. At the same time he rejected Moss FK, but he joined this club two years later. In late 2006 he spent time on loan at IL Hødd, and ahead of the 2007 season he moved permanently to Drøbak/Frogn IL. In 2009, he returned to his old club Strømmen. After the season, he went on to Nesodden IF.

References

1977 births
Living people
Norwegian footballers
Strømmen IF players
Vålerenga Fotball players
Hønefoss BK players
Moss FK players
IL Hødd players
Drøbak-Frogn IL players
People from Akershus
People from Enebakk
Association football forwards
Sportspeople from Viken (county)